DeJuan Anthony Groce (born February 17, 1980) is a former American football cornerback. He was drafted in the 2003 NFL Draft by the St. Louis Rams. Groce has also played for the New Orleans Saints, the Seattle Seahawks, and the Toronto Argonauts. Groce played collegiate football for the Nebraska Cornhuskers and set or tied four school records as well as an NCAA record. He received his Communications degree in December 2002.

Early life
DeJuan Groce was born on February 17, 1980, to Debra and Warren Groce. Growing up, he was very involved in a wide variety of sports including football, basketball, and track. Groce attended St. Edward High School in Lakewood, Ohio, and was a letterman in football and track athletics. In football, he was named to the PrepStar's Dream Team. In track, he ran a personal best of 10.7 seconds in the 100 meters and 21.9 seconds in the 200 meters.

College career
Following high school, Groce chose to attend the University of Nebraska over Michigan State, Indiana, Ohio State and Syracuse, where he played football and was a member of Kappa Alpha Psi fraternity. As a freshman, Groce was redshirted. As a red shirt freshman, Groce played in every game as the backup left corner, taking over as the left corner when Keyou Craver moved to nickel back. Groce had at least one tackle in 12-of-13 games and had 24 tackles. As a red shirt sophomore, Groce broke Ralph Brown's school record for pass breakups in a season with 17. In 2001, as a redshirt junior, Groce had his most productive season, starting every game at cornerback as well as returning kickoffs and punts. Additionally, Groce was named a First-team AP All-American for his punt-return duties, finishing fourth nationally with 17.0 yards per punt return.

As a senior, Groce was selected as one of the three team captains. He continued his productive career by starting every game of his redshirt-senior season. Against Troy State, Groce set a school record and tied an NCAA record with two punt return touchdowns and a pair of first-quarter interceptions in a 31–16 win. Overall, Groce set or tied four school records and set one NCAA record. Additionally, Groce joined 1972 Heisman Trophy winner Johnny Rodgers as the only players in NU history to amass 1,000 career punt return yards.
In December 2002, Groce received a Communications degree.

College statistics

Professional career

Pre-draft

St. Louis Rams
He was selected by the St. Louis Rams with the tenth pick of the fourth round of the 2003 NFL Draft.

New Orleans Saints
The New Orleans Saints released Groce on June 15, 2007.

Toronto Argonauts
On May 31, 2008, Groce signed with the Toronto Argonauts of the Canadian Football League. However, Groce was released before the start of the regular season.

References

1980 births
Living people
People from Garfield Heights, Ohio
St. Edward High School (Lakewood, Ohio) alumni
American football cornerbacks
Nebraska Cornhuskers football players
St. Louis Rams players
New Orleans Saints players
Seattle Seahawks players